{{safesubst:#invoke:RfD||2=White Points|month = January
|day = 20
|year = 2023
|time = 11:54
|timestamp = 20230120115404

|content=
REDIRECT Region of Queens Municipality

}}